This is a list of the number-one hits of 2011 on FIMI's Italian Singles and Albums Charts.

See also
 2011 in music
 List of number-one hits in Italy

References

Number-one hits
Italy
2011

it:Classifica FIMI Artisti#Liste degli album al numero 1